Oakwood Lakes State Park is a South Dakota state park in Brookings County, South Dakota in the United States.  The park is open for year-round recreation including camping, swimming, fishing, hiking and boating on Johnson Lake and Lake Tetonkaha. There are 136 campsites and 6 cabins.  The visitor center features an archaeology display of items found in the area. Other activities include a boat ramp, canoe and kayak rentals, horse camp sites and cross-country skiing.

References

External links
 Oakwood Lakes State Park

Protected areas of Brookings County, South Dakota
State parks of South Dakota